Henry Richard Kranzler (born February 11, 1950) is an American psychologist who serves as a professor of psychiatry and Director of the Center for Studies of Addiction at the Perelman School of Medicine of the University of Pennsylvania, where he has worked since 2010. He previously taught at the University of Connecticut. His research focuses on addiction medicine, especially genetic and pharmacological aspects of alcoholism and other substance use disorders. He is the editor-in-chief of Alcoholism: Clinical and Experimental Research.

Early life and education 
Born in Newark, New Jersey, Kranzler attended Shore Regional High School in West Long Branch, New Jersey, and went on to earn a Bachelor of Arts from Monmouth University, a Master of Arts from Rutgers University before earning an MD from Robert Wood Johnson Medical School.

References

External links

1950 births
Living people
American psychiatrists
Perelman School of Medicine at the University of Pennsylvania faculty
Medical journal editors
Researchers in alcohol abuse
Physicians from Newark, New Jersey
Monmouth University alumni
Rutgers University alumni
University of Connecticut faculty